Covario, Inc. was an American search marketing agency and technology firm based in San Diego, California. The company specialized in international search engine marketing services and provided software tools for SEO, paid search, social media marketing, analytics, and local search optimization. Its customer base included technology, consumer electronics, financial services, retail, ecommerce, media, entertainment, publishing, and consumer packaged goods organizations. Covario was acquired by the Dentsu Aegis Network in September 2014, and combined with iProspect, the network's performance marketing arm, in early 2015.

History
Covario was founded as "SEMDirector" in 2006 by Dema Zlotin, Curt Nelson, and Russ Mann as a spin-out of Zlotin and Nelson's software development consulting firm Silicon Space, Inc. SEMDirector focused on B2B Search Marketing.  The company initially focused on Pay per click (PPC) and Search Engine Optimization (SEO) software analytics. In 2008, the company changed its name to Covario, Inc. In 2012, the company created two business units: the Covario search marketing agency, and the Rio SEO platform of software tools. The company hosts a website which includes a blog and search engine marketing resources.

In 2010, Covario acquired Netconcepts of Madison, Wisconsin, a developer of SEO automation software. In 2012, Covario rebranded its SaaS (software-as-a-service)-based software business unit under the Rio SEO name. In June 2012, Rio SEO acquired Top Local Search, a developer of local search optimization software for national brands and multi-location businesses. In November 2012, Rio SEO acquired Meteor Solutions, developer of social media advertising and analytics software.

Until 2014, Covario, Inc. encompassed the Covario search agency, which provided global SEO/SEM and content marketing services, as well as Rio SEO, which markets and develops SEO automation tools, analytics, and social media software.

For three years in a row, Covario was named search agency of the year by OMMA (The Magazine of Online Media, Marketing and Advertising). The firm was awarded the OMMA search agency of the year award in 2011 and again in 2012 and 2013.

In 2012, Rio SEO was named the leader in SEO Automation in the first Forrester review of SEO platforms.  
 
On November 6, 2013, Covario Inc. co-founder and CEO Russ Mann became chairman of the firm, turning over the CEO duties to Mike Gullaksen and Jeff Johnson, formerly co-managing directors. Gullaksen and Johnson led Covario as co-chief executive officers, along with Claire Long, the company's chief financial and operating officer. 

On September 17, 2014, the search and content marketing business of Covario, Inc. was acquired by Dentsu Aegis (owned by Japanese holding company Dentsu, which transitioned the Covario agency unit into its iProspect performance marketing agency. However, Rio SEO, a software unit of Covario, remained an independent operating company.

Tools 
Covario's Rio SEO business unit offers software tools for analyzing and automating search marketing tasks. Covario received its first SEO patent, granted by the U.S. Patent and Trademark office, for a "Centralized Web-based Software Solution for Search Engine Optimization."

The company's software includes tools for tracking SEO analytics, automating the identification of popular keywords, tracking SEO and website changes and automatically optimizing websites for ecommerce without need for IT resources. Tools include a suite of local and mobile SEO tools for franchise operators, retailers, and other local businesses, and tools for social media marketing promotion. In January 2013, Rio SEO released its SEO Social Media Suite and SEO Social Advertising software, which integrate social advertising solutions into its SEO software.

Corporate affairs 
Covario had over 220 employees internationally with offices in Chicago, London, Beijing, Tokyo, Singapore, Toronto and São Paulo. Clients included Fortune 500 and Internet 1000 advertisers, including IBM, Intel, Nikon, Sony Pictures and T-Mobile. So far, Covario has raised $21.5 million in venture capital from Voyager Capital, Dubilier & Co. and FT Ventures.

Dentsu Aegis, owned by Japanese holding company Dentsu, agreed on September 17, 2014, to acquire the search and content marketing agency business of Covario, Inc. Dentsu Aegis plans to transition the Covario agency unit into its iProspect performance marketing agency.
Separately, Rio SEO, the software unit of Covario, announced it will remain an independent operating company.

References 

2006 establishments in California
Companies based in San Diego
American companies established in 2006
Digital marketing companies of the United States
Search engine optimization companies
Privately held companies based in California
Dentsu Aegis Network brands
2014 mergers and acquisitions